Maly Oreshkin is a rural locality (a khutor) in Mikhaylovka Urban Okrug, Volgograd Oblast, Russia. The population was 100 as of 2010. There are 8 streets.

Geography 
Maly Oreshkin is located 21 km northeast of Mikhaylovka. Mokhovsky is the nearest rural locality.

References 

Rural localities in Mikhaylovka urban okrug